The Royal Academy for Overseas Sciences or RAOS (or ARSOM; , KAOW) is a Belgian federal academy that contributes to the progress of scientific knowledge about overseas regions. It is located in Uccle, Brussels and is one of Belgium's numerous academies.

History
The academy was founded in 1928 as the Royal Belgian Colonial Institute (Institut royal colonial belge). It was renamed in 1954 as the Royal Academy of Colonial Sciences (Académie royale des sciences coloniales). Its interests were initially restricted to the Belgian colonial empire and particularly the Belgian Congo until decolonisation. In 1959, it was renamed the Royal Academy of Overseas Sciences (Académie royale des sciences d'outre-mer) and broadened its geographical remit to include Sub-Saharan Africa, Latin America, Asia, and Oceania. The academy organises a wide range of activities, including publications, academic conferences, and annual competititions.

The Royal Academy for Overseas Sciences is divided into three Sections:
 Section of Human Sciences
 Section of Natural and Medical Sciences
 Section of Technical Sciences

Competitions, scholarships and prizes
The Academy organizes yearly competitions with specific topics for each of its three Sections. Scholarships are also granted every year as part of the  Fund, which aim is to contribute to the training of future agricultural engineers or veterinary surgeons by giving them the opportunity to go for a training period in a developing country.

Finally the Academy awards the following  three-year prizes:
 The Lucien Cahen Prize for Geology (2012).
 The Yola Verhasselt Prize for Tropical Geography (2013).
 The Fernand Suykens Prize for the study of ports (2013).
 The Jean-Jacques and Berthe Symoens Prize for Tropical Limnology (2014).

Publications
Works produced by the society include:
  
 , 1948-2015; 11 volumes  (Also called Biographie Coloniale Belge)
 Bulletin des Seances. 1930- (online) 
 Commission d'Histoire du Congo. (Publications.) 1953-1958.
 Livre blanc: Apport scientifique de la Belgique au developpement de l'Afrique centrale.  1962-
 Memoires (online) 
 Memoires de la classe des sciences morales et politiques. 1933- 
 Memoires de la classe des sciences naturelles et medicales. 1931- 
 Memoires de la classe des sciences techniques. 1930-

See also
 Belgian overseas colonies
 Société Belge d'Études Coloniales (est. 1894)
 Colonial University of Belgium (est. 1920 in Antwerp)

References

External links

 

Scientific organisations based in Belgium
Science and technology in Belgium
Organisations based in Belgium with royal patronage
1928 establishments in Belgium
Belgian colonial empire